Peter Hluško (born 22 December 1970) is a retired Slovak football defender.

References

1970 births
Living people
Slovak footballers
MŠK Považská Bystrica (football) players
1. FC Tatran Prešov players
MŠK Žilina players
FC Spartak Trnava players
Association football defenders
Czechoslovak First League players